Sadaf Rahimi (pronounced sad-aff or suh-daff last name: ra - he - me) is a female boxer from Afghanistan. She made history by being the first female boxer to be invited to the 2012 London Olympics and being the first female boxer in the national team.

Early life

Rahimi started boxing at the age of 14 after she watched Laila Ali box in a competition. Rahimi is coached by Saber Sharifi, a former male professional boxer, who currently trains 30 Afghan girls and young women in Kabul's Ghazi stadium. In order to train, Rahimi had to gain permission from her family. Women rights have often been limited under the Tablian rule; however, Rahimi’s family is very supportive of her decision to box. Rahimi trains three days a week for an hour in the Ghazi stadium and also practices in her home.

At the age of 17, Rahimi was given a wildcard to compete in the London 2012 Olympics. Unfortunately, due to her safety in the ring the International Boxing Association (AIBA) decided that Rahimi should not compete. Rahimi hopes to Qualify and fight in the 2016 Rio Olympics.

Media appearances
Rahimi’s and other Afghan female boxers’ story was told in a documentary which was directed by Ariel Nasr and Produced by Annette Clarke. The documentary entitled  The Boxing Girls of Kabul was  made for the National Film Board of Canada and received several awards and nominations.

Quotes

"I'll proudly fight for women and Afghanistan.”

"The first time I hit someone it was in my village, I was 11. It was actually my cousin...afterwards he said I hit him so hard that I should become a boxer!"

“I am sure I will be punched like a bag. Like I am a pillow being pummeled...whether I win a medal or not, I will be a symbol of courage as soon as I step into the ring.”

References

Afghan women boxers
Living people
Year of birth missing (living people)